The Chino Valley Champion, is a weekly newspaper serving the Chino Valley area of Southern California.

The Champion publishes every Saturday morning and is zoned into Chino and Chino Hills editions.

History

19th Century

Richard Gird, the founder of Chino, also founded the Chino Valley Champion in 1887, as a "promotional sheet for the sale of the lands of the Chino rancho and to propagandize his newly established community. It was the first business in the new town.  John Wasson, a real estate agent in Pomona, was the first editor. Everything that Gird purchased to put out the newspaper, its presses and its type, was bought "direct from the factory."

Although it was announced that "B.U. Mofflit, late of the Oakland Tribune, will have charge of the newspaper," the first editor was actually John Wasson. The first issue of the Champion Valley Champion came off the press on November 11, 1887.

Wasson later wrote, "The first number appeared before there was but one dwelling north of Chino Creek, and only four or five other buildings, including barns." Wasson ran 600 to 2000 copies a week. Two pages were printed at a time on a foot-powered press.

The Los Angeles Herald said of the first issue that the newspaper was "already setting forth the merits of this delightful location" and later that the newspaper was a "well conducted, artistic little sheet."

On the Champion's tenth birthday, its second owner and publisher, Edwin Rhodes, wrote: "It is a veritable fact that in the case of Chino a newspaper was started and the town built around it."

In 1891 Wasson was listed as publisher of the newspaper, but in that year also he left the paper, having bought a half interest in the Pomona Times.

20th Century

Edwin Rhodes was editor for 16 years, from 1890 to 1906, later becoming president of the First National and Chino Savings Bank.

In 1906, Charles A Gardner was owner and publisher. He dropped the word Valley from the newspaper's masthead and renamed it Chino Champion, effective May 4.

Ralph Homan, who operated a local store with his father, bought the newspaper in 1909.

In 1920, Homan went into law, selling to a Nebraska newspaperman, Elmer Howell Sr. Howell was later joined by his brother-in-law, Charles Frady, and then by nephew E.R. (Bob) Frady, who was the editor until 1949. The Champion published twice a week in the 1920s.

In 1956, Allen P. McCombs came to town, right out of navy service. The young college-educated outsider from Berkeley completed 50 years as editor and publisher on October 1, 2006. In 1958, a weekly Shopping News was published on Wednesday and sent to non-subscribers. The Champion continued to publish on Thursday. The need for speedier printing led to the purchase of a used roll-fed Duplex press that printed and folded eight pages at once. During the 1960s, to keep up with trends in the newspaper industry, the Champion converted from "hot type" to offset. By 1970, the Duplex had been scrapped and the printing was "farmed out" to a larger printing firm in Riverside.

Less than a year later two-thirds of the building was gutted by fire, started by a Molotov cocktail thrown during a period of ethnic strife. The Champion continued publication from temporary quarters until a fast-working local contractor had the building repaired four months later.

The community was doubling in population every 10 years. The opening of the Pomona Freeway brought new business. In 1972, the Chino Valley News was put out on Wednesday and sent to everybody. The paid-subscription Champion was moved to Friday. In 1978, the South Ontario News was started, and in 1980, a Sunday Champion was published, but it lasted only eight months. In 1988, the Chino Hills News was added, three years before the new city incorporated.

The disappearance of the hometown weekly from the Southern California scene led the Champion to strengthen its position. On August 4, 1994, the Champion combined its paid and free newspapers into the once-a-week Chino and Chino Hills editions, distributed on Thursday to everybody.

This delivery was changed to Saturday in 1999 to accommodate a new classified ad linkup with the Press Enterprise of San Bernardino and Riverside counties, which was now printing the Champion.

In 2000, Bruce Wood, a former Champion general manager, returned as co-publisher.

21st Century

The prepress production of the Champion evolved in July 2004 when it converted to digital pagination. Over a period of several weeks, the Champion converted to digital output of pages using computers and new software and delivered them electronically to the printer with a high speed internet connection.

Due to press capacity limitations, the printing of the Champion was switched from the Press-Enterprise to the San Bernardino Sun/USA Today printing facility in April 2005. This allowed for an increase in the use of full color photography in the presentation of news and advertising. Total circulation had reached nearly 42,800 homes by October 2006.

On October 7, 2006, McCombs announced he had named his co-publisher, Bruce Wood, as publisher of Champion Newspapers. He would be stepping down as publisher after  50 years. He would remain active in the newspaper, however, as publisher emeritus and chairman of Champion Publications of Chino, Inc., the parent company.

On July 7, 2012 the Champion returned to the Riverside Press-Enterprise to be printed after the latter worked at winning back the contract.

A little over a year later in December 2014, the Champion switched to its current printer, The Desert Sun in Palm Springs. Total Champion circulation averaged slightly more than 41,000 by September  2015.

ChampionNewspapers.com was upgraded again in June 2015 to include all content from the printed newspaper plus online only content, photo galleries, videos and comments from readers behind a metered “pay wall”.

William H. "Will" Fleet and business partner Ralph Alldredge purchased the Champion Newspapers on Feb. 1, 2017, after more than 60 years of ownership by Allen McCombs. The legal entity that owns Champion Newspapers is Golden State Newspapers LLC, which is wholly owned by Fleet and Alldredge. Fleet is the Managing Member of the LLC.

The Champion is one of the few independent weekly newspapers left in Southern California, and one of the largest.

List of publishers

 John Wasson (1887-1891)
 Edwin Rhodes (1891-1906)
 Charles A. Gardner (1906-1907)
 John M. Reed (1907-1909)
 Ralph C. Homan (1909-1920)
 Elmer L. Howell Sr. and Charles H. Frady (1920-1949)
 J.S. (Jack) Randolph Jr. and J.M. (Joe) Kaukusch (1949)
 Harry H. Hobart and William Hobart (1950-1952)
 E.V. Pederson (1952-1956) and R.E. Blankenburg (1952–56)
 Allen P. McCombs and Gretchen McCombs (1956-2006)
 Bruce Wood, co-publisher (2000-2006)
Bruce Wood, publisher (2006-2017)
 William H. "Will" Fleet (2017 to present)

References

External links
  "Champion Equipment Typical of That Found in a Small Newspaper," Chino Champion, November 8, 1962
Champion Newspapers website

Newspapers published in Greater Los Angeles
Mass media in the Inland Empire
Mass media in San Bernardino County, California
Chino, California
Chino Hills, California
Publications established in 1887
1887 establishments in California
Weekly newspapers published in California